Dishwalla is the self-titled fourth studio album by Dishwalla. The album was released on March 15, 2005.

Track listing
All tracks by Dishwalla

 "40 Stories" - 4:29
 "Collide" - 4:49
 "Ease the Moment" - 5:54
 "Coral Sky" - 3:44
 "Winter Sun" - 3:50
 "Creeps in the Stone" - 3:41
 "Surrender the Crown" - 3:49
 "Bleeding Out" - 3:47
 "Life for Sale" - 2:59
 "Above the Wreckage" - 3:31
 "Far Away" - 4:08
 "Collide (Massy Mix)" - 4:39

Personnel 
Produced by Sylvia Massy, Bill Szymczyk and Ryan Greene.

J.R. Richards – vocals, guitar
Rodney Cravens – guitars
Scot Alexander – bass
Pete Maloney – drums, percussion
Jim Wood – keyboards

References

Dishwalla albums
2005 albums
Albums produced by Bill Szymczyk
Albums produced by Ryan Greene